Mad Dash Racing is a racing video game for the Xbox developed by Crystal Dynamics and published by Eidos Interactive. It was released as a launch title in November 2001. The video game features the voices of Billy West and Charles Martinet.

Plot
On a little island known as Trem Land, a crazed wizard named Hex plans to take over the world using red meteor chunks to power his device. He can't do this on his own so he forms a contest and invites a group of miscellaneous characters so that they can race each other across the island in search of the 7 red meteor chunks. In return, Hex initial offers the winner a brand new pig, until Sid. one of the playable contestants, states that according to the contract they signed, the winner would receive Hex's Magical Scepter. Hex reluctantly agrees and the contest begins. The player can play as several different characters, which fall into 3 separate categories of  Bashers, Gliders, and dashers, all of which have unique abilities that can allow access to short cuts through out the map. As the player progresses, more of the characters can join the team and become playable.  

After completing several races and collecting all 7 red meteor chucks, Hex's real plan of world domination becomes clear and the player must race Hex to his machine and destroy it.  Upon doing so, Hex's machine is hit with a blast from the aforementioned magical scepter and the device explodes as Hex's plans are foiled. Initially no one is harmed in the explosion, but as Hex begins to remark about getting out unscathed, his magical scepter falls nearby and transforms him into a pig. Immediately following this, Hex's minions place a 1st prize blue ribbon on the now pig-Hex and carry him and his scepter to the player's character as their prize.

Gameplay
The Characters are split into four different groups: Bashers, Dashers, Gliders, and Bosses. Bashers are able to break through certain objects, Dashers are able to gain quick boosts, Gliders are able to jump farther or glide, and Bosses are able to have all the powers. It is very similar to Sonic R and Running Wild. Players can collect 10 green meteor chunks and become a Tribrid. As a Tribrid players can have Bashers, Dashers and Gliders with just using one character. There are 9 tracks all together in the game. Different tracks have different settings. Numerous licensed music tracks were featured in the game.

Reception

The game received "mixed" reviews according to the review aggregation website Metacritic. NextGen said that the game is a hardcore cart racer despite its misleading cute and fuzzy look. In Japan, Famitsu gave it a score of 28 out of 40.

Notes

References

External links
 

2001 video games
Crystal Dynamics games
Eidos Interactive games
Racing video games
Video games developed in the Netherlands
Video games developed in the United States
Xbox games
Xbox-only games
Nixxes Software games
Multiplayer and single-player video games